The men's 4 × 400 metres relay event at the 1990 Commonwealth Games was held on 2 and 3 February at the Mount Smart Stadium in Auckland. In the heats of the race some of the biggest medal favourites, England, Australia, and Trinidad and Tobago were disqualified for a change outside the takeover zone. All three teams protested the decision but to no avail. In their absence, Kenya took gold followed by Scotland and Jamaica.

Medalists

* Athletes who competed in heats only and received medals.

Results

Heats
Qualification: First 4 teams of each heat (Q) plus the next 1 fastest (q) qualified for the final.

Final

References

Heats results

Relay
1990